Awrey is a surname. Notable people with the name include:

 Don Awrey (born 1943), Canadian professional hockey defenceman
 Nicholas Awrey (1851–1897), Ontario farmer and political figure
 Randy Awrey (born April 27, 1956) is an American football coach and player

See also
 Awrey Island, uninhabited island located in the Hudson Bay Nunavut, Canada